Pinkilluni (Quechua pinkillu a kind of flute, Aymara -ni a suffix to indicate ownership, "the one with a pinkillu", Hispanicized spelling Pinquillone) is a mountain in the Peruvian Andes, about  high. It is located in the Moquegua Region, Mariscal Nieto Province, Carumas District, and in the Puno Region, Puno Province,  Pichacani District. Pinkilluni lies northwest of the mountain Q'iwiri.

References

Mountains of Moquegua Region
Mountains of Puno Region
Mountains of Peru